Tongzhi ("Comprehensive Records") is an 1161 Chinese general knowledge encyclopedia written by Zheng Qiao (鄭樵) in the Song dynasty, containing 200 chapters on diverse topics.

Contents
After the Tongdian, it was the second encyclopedia of the Santong (The Three Encyclopedias), which were often published together. It is also included second among the Shitong (The Ten Encyclopedias), compiled in the Qing dynasty. The Tongzhi became a model for most of the later encyclopedias.

Tongzhi is arranged in 200 volumes (juan), plus three volumes of notes. The historical information covers from earliest times to the end of the Tang dynasty. The contents include basic annals, yearly chronicles, hereditary houses, ranked biographies, and twenty monographs (lüe 略) on various topics, the last of which are considered the most original part. The twenty monographs, which comprise 52 volumes, deal with clans, the six classes of characters, phonetics, astronomy, geography, capital cities, rituals, posthumous names, vessels and robes, music, official titles, the examination system, punishment, food and money, arts and literature, collation, images, metal and stone, disasters and fortunes, insects and plants. The comprehensivity of these monographs has long been noted; the Siku Quanshu Zongmu Tiyao (completed in 1798) praised them in particular.

The chapter on images (Tu pu lüe 图谱略) has attracted considerable interest among art theorists. In this section, he gives images primacy in transmitting values, using metaphor that compares the images as the warp (jing 經) and the text as the weft (wei 緯).

The chapter on arts and literature (Yi wen lüe 藝文略) has the most detailed bibliographic scheme in pre-modern China.

Modern editions
 Shanghai guji, 1993
 Zhonghua, 1995

Notes

1161 in Asia
12th century in China
1161 works
Song dynasty literature
Leishu
12th-century Chinese books